The Centre Sportif Lacroix-Dutil is a multi-purpose arena in Saint-Georges, Quebec, Canada. It has a capacity of 2,476.

History 
In 2011, plans were revealed for an expansion of the facility. It involved an extension constructed on an adjacent car park.

References 

Indoor ice hockey venues in Quebec
Indoor arenas in Quebec
Saint-Georges, Quebec
Sports venues in Quebec
Buildings and structures in Chaudière-Appalaches